Elmar Kunauer (18 April 1940 – 17 December 2022) was an Austrian sprinter. He competed in the men's 100 metres at the 1960 Summer Olympics.

References

1940 births
2022 deaths
Athletes (track and field) at the 1960 Summer Olympics
Austrian male sprinters
Olympic athletes of Austria
People from Wolfsberg District